Akshay Laxman is an Indian stage magician and mentalist. Winner of an episode of the talent show Entertainment Ke Liye Kuch Bhi Karega on Sony Entertainment Television in the year 2014.

Early life and education 
Akshay was born in Navi Mumbai, India. He attended the Fr. Agnel School in Vashi and completed bachelor's degree in mass media and psychology from the Tilak College from Vashi.

Career 
Akshay was inspired by the illusionist David Copperfield at the age of five. He first performed in a stage show in 2003. He gained attention in 2011 after he performed magic shows in Carnival Cruise Line. Akshay's career got a breakthrough after performing in the India's Got Talent. Later, he performed a magic show for Aamir Khan and his family. Akshay is also known for appearing in shows such as Entertainment Ke Liye.

Television

References 

Indian magicians
1990 births
Living people
People from Mumbai